Blue Eyed Soul is the twelfth studio album by British pop group Simply Red. The album was released on 8 November 2019 by BMG.

Chart performance
The album debuted at number six on the UK Albums Chart, selling 9,772 copies in its first week. It is Simply Red's 14th top 10 album in the United Kingdom.

Track listing
The vinyl release has a slightly different song order from the CD and digital releases. Apparently, the preferred order is that of the vinyl release, which favours slower songs earlier.

CD and digital download version

LP version

Personnel 
Simply Red
 Mick Hucknall – vocals, backing vocals (5, 6, 8)
 Dave Clayton – keyboards, backing vocals (5, 6, 8)
 Kenji Suzuki – guitars, backing vocals (5, 6, 8)
 Steve Lewinson – bass
 Roman Roth – drums, backing vocals (5, 6, 8)
 Ian Kirkham – saxophones
 Kevin Robinson – trumpet, backing vocals (1, 5-8), percussion (5, 6, 8, 9)

Additional musicians
 Danny Saxon – additional keyboards (1, 2, 3, 7)
 Andy Wright – programming, additional keyboards (1, 5, 8, 9), percussion (5, 6, 8, 9)
 Gavin Goldberg – programming, additional guitars (1)
 Peter-John Vettese – string programming (10), arrangements (10)
 Mark Jaimes – additional guitars (1, 2, 3, 7)
 Marc JB – additional beats (1)
 Chris De Margary – saxophones

Strings (Tracks 2, 3 & 4)
 Peter-John Vettese – arrangements (2, 3)
 Sam Swallow – arrangements (4)
 Amy Stewart – string contractor for Isobel Griffiths Ltd.
 Dave Daniels – cello
 Peter Lale and Bruce White – viola 
 Ian Humphries, Patrick Kiernan, Everton Nelson and Emlyn Singleton – violin

Production 
 Andy Wright – producer
 Gavin Goldberg – engineer, mixing (1), additional mixing 
 Mick Hucknall – mixing (2-10)
 Lewis Chapman – assistant engineer, mix engineer
 Tony Cousins – mastering at Metropolis Mastering (London, UK)
 Stuart Crouch Creative – design, cover illustration 
 Dean Chalkley – photography 
 Quietus Management Ltd. – management

Charts

References

2019 albums
Simply Red albums